Mrs. Deadpool and the Howling Commandos is a comic book series published by Marvel Comics.

Publication history
The series was part of the "Secret Wars" event in 2015.

Plot
While her husband Deadpool is dead, Shiklah is engaged to Dracula. In order to find the pieces of the Scepter of the Manticore, Shiklah persuades Dracula to let her go on this quest as he assigns his Howling Commandos (consisting of Frankenstein's Monster, Man-Thing, Marcus the Centaur, N'Kantu, the Living Mummy, Werewolf by Night) to accompany her. When Deadpool's ghost visits her, he possessed the body of Dracula's servant Joshua which enables Shiklah to kill Dracula. Afterwards, Shiklah ignores the warning from Deadpool's ghost of challenging God Emperor Doom. As a result, she and her resistance group get themselves killed by the Thor Corps who have taken notice of what happened in Monster Metropolis.

Reception
The series holds an average rating of 7.2 by five professional critics on the review aggregation website Comic Book Roundup.

Doug Zawisza of CBR.com states that the writer Gerry Duggan brings in the a madcap, anything-goes type of humor into the series that he has previously used in Deadpool and that the series is everything someone would expect from a Duggan Deadpool comic with the added bonus of a lot of monsters.

Prints

Issues

Collected editions

See also
 2015 in comics

References

External links
 Mrs. Deadpool and the Howling Commandos at the Comic Book DB

Howling Commandos